Stuart McLoughlin (born 1980 in Bristol) is a British actor. He is notable for his appearance in the title role in 2008's Clone. His other TV appearances include 2008's Little Dorrit and Waking the Dead (1 episode, 2005), and he has also appeared onstage in A Matter of Life and Death. He has appeared in the 2007 film Elizabeth: The Golden Age.

Radio

References

External links

 Stuart McLoughlin radio appearances

Living people
English male television actors
English male radio actors
1980 births
Male actors from Bristol